"Love Is Strange" is a crossover hit by American rhythm and blues duet Mickey & Sylvia, which was released in late November 1956 by the Groove record label.

The song was based on a guitar riff by Jody Williams and was written by Bo Diddley under the name of his wife at the time, Ethel Smith; it was recorded by Bo and Buddy Holly, among others. The guitar riff was also used by Dave "Baby" Cortez in his 1962 instrumental song "Rinky Dink", also credited to Diddley.

Background and recordings 
At a concert at Howard Theatre in Washington, D.C. Mickey and Sylvia heard Jody Williams play a guitar riff that Williams had played on Billy Stewart's debut single "Billy's Blues". "Billy's Blues" was released as a single in June 1956 and the instrumentation combined a regular blues styling with Afro-Cuban styling. Sylvia Robinson claims that she and Mickey Baker wrote the lyrics, while Bo Diddley claims that he wrote them.

The first recorded version of "Love Is Strange" was performed by Bo Diddley, who recorded his version on May 24, 1956 with Jody Williams on lead guitar. This version was not released until its appearance on I'm a Man: The Chess Masters, 1955–1958 in 2007. Mickey & Sylvia's version was recorded several months later on October 17, 1956. A second Mickey & Sylvia studio recording, recorded some years after, featured now-legendary drummer Bernard "Pretty" Purdie on his first paid session gig. Another early version was by UK singer Michael Holliday who recorded the song in 1957.

The song is noted for its spoken dialogue section which goes as follows:

"Sylvia!"

"Yes, Mickey."

"How do you call your Lover Boy?"

"Come here, Lover Boy!"

"And if he doesn't answer?"

"Oh, Lover Boy!"

"And if he still doesn't answer?"

"I simply say..."

(Sung)  "Baby/ Oh baby/ My sweet baby/ You're the one."

(The sung part is repeated with Mickey singing the harmony.)

(This is followed by a repeat of the instrumental section before the song's fade.)

Charts and accolades 
"Love Is Strange" peaked at #1 on Billboard magazine's most played by jockeys R&B Singles chart on March 6, 1957 and #11 on the Hot 100. In 2004 "Love Is Strange" was inducted into the Grammy Hall of Fame for its influence as a rock and roll single.

Cover versions

Full covers and adaptations

Samplings
Part of the song was sampled for the song ”Rinky Dink” by Dave "Baby" Cortez and for the 2012 Pitbull hit "Back in Time" from Men In Black 3.

In popular culture
The song was featured in the 1987 film Dirty Dancing and included on the soundtrack, which is one of the best-selling albums of all time.

The spoken part is parodied by Eric Bloom and Buck Dharma of Blue Öyster Cult in a live recording of "7 Screaming Diz-Busters" on their 1975 album On Your Feet or on Your Knees:

Bloom: I know Lucifer so well I call him by his first name!
Dharma: What do you call him?
Bloom: I call him, hey Lu!
Dharma: And if he don't answer?
Bloom: I say, hey Lu... lover boy...

The song is parodied in the 1973 New York Dolls song "Trash", where singer David Johansen quotes "Oh how do you call your loverboy? ... Trash!" then later uses the same melody for several bars. 

The song is "covered" by the fictional Scottish band "The Majestics" in the BBC Television series Tutti Frutti (1987), starring Emma Thompson, Robbie Coltrane, Maurice Roeves, Jake D'Arcy and Stuart McGugan. 

The spoken part is referenced by Lou Reed at the end of his song "Beginning of A Great Adventure" on his 1989 album New York. He had married Sylvia Morales in 1980.

The song appears also in the Dennis Potter 1993 TV miniseries Lipstick on Your Collar where Mickey and Sylvia become the two main characters.

It also gained a following after appearing in Deep Throat (1972). The song was also played in the Terrence Malick film Badlands (1973) and in Martin Scorsese's 1995 film Casino when Robert Deniro sees Sharon Stone for the first time.. The song also is played in the 2000 HBO hit show The Sopranos, season two, episode 6 ("The Happy Wanderer"). It can also be heard playing in the second episode of The Wire.

References

1956 songs
1956 singles
1967 singles
American rhythm and blues songs
American rock-and-roll songs
Mickey & Sylvia songs
Buddy Holly songs
Sonny & Cher songs
Male–female vocal duets
Buck Owens songs
Susan Raye songs
Kenny Rogers songs
Dolly Parton songs
Betty Everett songs
Songs released posthumously
Reprise Records singles
Songs written by Sylvia Robinson
Songs written by Bo Diddley
The Crickets songs